The 2020 York9 FC season was the second season in the club's history and the last under the York9 name.

Squad
As of August 16, 2020.

Transfers

In

Draft picks 
York9 FC selected the following players in the 2019 CPL–U Sports Draft on November 11, 2019. Draft picks are not automatically signed to the team roster. Only those who are signed to a contract will be listed as transfers in.

Out

Canadian Premier League

Match times are Eastern Daylight Time (UTC−4).

First stage

Table

Results by match

Matches

Statistics

Squad and statistics 

|-
! colspan="14" style="background:#dcdcdc; text-align:center"| Goalkeepers

|-
! colspan="14" style="background:#dcdcdc; text-align:center"| Defenders

|-
! colspan="14" style="background:#dcdcdc; text-align:center"| Midfielders

|-
! colspan="14" style="background:#dcdcdc; text-align:center"| Forwards

|}

Top scorers 
{| class="wikitable sortable alternance"  style="font-size:85%; text-align:center; line-height:14px; width:85%;"
|-
!width=10|Rank
!width=10|Nat.
! scope="col" style="width:275px;"|Player
!width=10|Pos.
!width=80|Canadian Premier League
!width=80|TOTAL
|-
|rowspan=1|1|||| Joseph Di Chiara        || MF || 3 ||3
|-
|rowspan=1|2|||| Manny Aparicio         || FW || 2 ||2
|-
|rowspan=3|3|||| Álvaro Rivero         || FW || 1 ||1
|-
||| Kyle Porter         || FW || 1 ||1
|-
||| Lowell Wright         || FW || 1 ||1
|-
|- class="sortbottom"
| colspan="4"|Totals||8||8

Top assists 
{| class="wikitable sortable alternance"  style="font-size:85%; text-align:center; line-height:14px; width:85%;"
|-
!width=10|Rank
!width=10|Nat.
! scope="col" style="width:275px;"|Player
!width=10|Pos.
!width=80|Canadian Premier League
!width=80|TOTAL
|-
|rowspan=1|1|||| Kyle Porter        || MF || 1 ||1
|- class="sortbottom"
| colspan="4"|Totals||1||1

Clean sheets 
{| class="wikitable sortable alternance"  style="font-size:85%; text-align:center; line-height:14px; width:85%;"
|-
!width=10|Rank
!width=10|Nat.
! scope="col" style="width:275px;"|Player
!width=80|Canadian Premier League
!width=80|TOTAL
|-
|1|||| Nathan Ingham || 2 || 2
|-
|- class="sortbottom"
| colspan="3"|Totals||2||2

Disciplinary record 
{| class="wikitable sortable alternance"  style="font-size:85%; text-align:center; line-height:14px; width:85%;"
|-
!rowspan="2" width=10|No.
!rowspan="2" width=10|Pos.
!rowspan="2" width=10|Nat.
!rowspan="2" scope="col" style="width:275px;"|Player
!colspan="2" width=80|Canadian Premier League
!colspan="2" width=80|TOTAL
|-
! !!  !!  !! 
|-
|5||MF|||| Joseph Di Chiara    ||5||0||5||0
|-
|10||MF|||| Ryan Telfer ||3||0||3||0
|-
|26||DF|||| Manny Aparicio ||2||0||2||0
|-
|13||DF|||| Luca Gasparotto ||2||0||2||0
|-
|18||MF|||| Chris Mannella    ||1||0||1||0
|-
|8||MF|||| Fugo Segawa ||1||0||1||0
|-
|- class="sortbottom"
| colspan="4"|Totals||11||0||11||0

Notes

References

External links 
York9 FC official site

2020
2020 Canadian Premier League
Canadian soccer clubs 2020 season
2020 in Ontario